In mathematics, an H-matrix is a matrix whose comparison matrix is an M-matrix. It is useful in iterative methods.

Definition: Let  be a  complex matrix. If M(A) is a M-matrix, A is a H-matrix.

Invertible H-matrix guarantees convergence of Gauss–Seidel iterative methods.

See also 
 Hurwitz matrix
 P-matrix
 Perron–Frobenius theorem
 Z-matrix
 L-matrix
 M-matrix
 Comparison matrix

References 

Matrices